George Stevenson (13 April 1799 – 19 October 1856) was a pioneer South Australian newspaper editor and horticulturist. He came to Adelaide as private secretary to the first Governor of South Australia, John Hindmarsh.

Early life
Stevenson was born at Berwick-on-Tweed, Northumberland, England the son of a gentleman farmer who died when George was 12 years old. Soon afterwards Stevenson went to sea with an uncle. Not liking the life, he returned to Great Britain and began the study of medicine, but did not last long. Stevenson next went with a brother to Canada and worked on the land, and subsequently travelled in Central America and the West Indies. Around this time he began writing for the press and contributed to the London Globe and Examiner. Stevenson returned to England in 1830 and it has been stated that he collaborated with Henry Lytton Bulwer in his books on France which appeared in 1834 and 1836, but Stevenson's name is not mentioned in connection with either of these works. It is possible that he may have been employed to collect materials for them. Stevenson is reported to have been joint editor of the London Globe in 1835. An obituary rather has him as a "extensive contributor".

Stevenson married Margaret Gorton, of Chester, on 12 May 1836 at St George's, Hanover Square, London.

Australia
In 1836 Stevenson was appointed secretary to the Governor of South Australia, John Hindmarsh, and clerk of the council in the new Province of South Australia. Stevenson travelled on the Buffalo arriving at Adelaide on 28 December 1836, and read the governor's proclamation to the colonists. Before leaving London he had entered into partnership with Robert Thomas with the intention of starting a newspaper in South Australia. A preliminary number of the South Australian Gazette and Colonial Register was published in London on 18 June 1836, and about a year later, on 3 June 1837, this paper made its appearance at Adelaide. It was edited by Stevenson with ability but not without partisanship, and an attack on George Milner Stephen, who became acting governor in July 1838, led to an unsuccessful libel action against the paper.

Governor George Gawler arrived in October 1838 and after some criticism of him appeared in The Register, it lost its lucrative Government Gazette contract, hence the name change to South Australian Register. In the beginning of the 1840s difficult times came to Adelaide, and in 1842 Stevenson was obliged to give up his interest in the paper, selling it for £600 to James "Dismal Jemmy" Allen. It continued in the hands of John Stephens, Joseph Fisher, John Howard Clark and J. H. Finlayson for about 90 years; Stevenson afterwards established the South Australian Gazette and Colonial Register (1847–1848) and South Australian Gazette and Mining Journal (1848–1850), but it did not survive the exodus from South Australia which occurred after the discovery of gold in Victoria.

Stevenson was appointed coroner at Adelaide.

Horticulture
Though an able man Stevenson was not fortunate as an editor, but he did useful work in horticulture, often lecturing on the subject. When settlers complained about the hardness of the soil, Stevenson demonstrated its suitability for fruit and vegetable growing; confidently prophesying that over time South Australia would boast "orange groves as luxuriant and productive as those of Spain or Italy". With his gardener, George McEwin (1815–1885), Stevenson supplied most of the colony with vine cuttings, and set up a nursery for fruit trees. 
McEwin was the author of the South Australian Vigneron and Gardeners' Manual: containing plain practical directions for the cultivation of the vine; the propagation of fruit-trees, with catalogue and directions for cultivation; and the management of the kitchen garden, with catalogue of culinary vegetables, &c. &c, and later founded "Glen Ewin" orchard

Stevenson has been dubbed the "Father of Horticulture in South Australia". He was, with John Barton Hack, one of the two first winegrowers in South Australia. Both Stevenson and Hack planted their first grapes at North Adelaide in 1837: Stevenson at "Melbourne Cottage" on his block between Melbourne Street and Finniss Street; Hack on his "Chichester Gardens" between Melbourne Street and Stanley Street. These properties were cut up for housing three or four years later.

Stevenson then rented the "Old Botanic Garden" (on the River Torrens below McKinnon Parade, North Adelaide) 1842–1843. This area was later rented by William Haines then George Francis, who pressed for a properly constituted Botanic Gardens.

Legacy
Stevenson died at his home, Lytton Lodge, in Finniss Street, North Adelaide on 18 October 1856, and was survived by a daughter and two sons, one being George J. W. Stevenson (1839–1893), politician and journalist. His daughter Margaret Jane Stevenson (1844–1918) married Ernest Maudslay de Mole in 1868; their daughter Violet de Mole (1874–1946) was a noted teacher of French.

References

1799 births
1856 deaths
Australian journalists
Australian newspaper editors
Settlers of South Australia
Australian horticulturists
People from Berwick-upon-Tweed